Juan Carlos Pallares Bueno (born 30 April 1970) is a Mexican politician from the National Action Party. From 2000 to 2003 he served as Deputy of the LVIII Legislature of the Mexican Congress representing Quintana Roo.

References

1970 births
Living people
Politicians from Quintana Roo
National Action Party (Mexico) politicians
21st-century Mexican politicians
Deputies of the LVIII Legislature of Mexico
Members of the Chamber of Deputies (Mexico) for Quintana Roo